The following is an alphabetical list of topics related to Nicaragua.

0–9

.ni – Internet country code top-level domain for Nicaragua
1966 National Opposition Union

A
Abortion in Nicaragua
Acoyapa
Adán Cárdenas
Adjacent countries:

Adolfo Calero
Adolfo Díaz
Aeronica
Agkistrodon bilineatus
Agriculture in Nicaragua
Alexander Vandegrift
Alexis Argüello
Alfonso Cortés
Alfonso Robelo
Alfredo Gómez Urcuyo
Alliance for the Republic
Altagracia
Alternative for Change
América Managua
American Nicaraguan School
American sweetgum
Americas
North America
Central America
Islands of Nicaragua
North Atlantic Ocean
Mar Caribe (Caribbean)
North Pacific Ocean
Aminta Granera
Anastasio Somoza Debayle
Anastasio Somoza García
Anastasio Somoza Portocarrero
Ancient footprints of Acahualinca
Apoyo Lagoon Natural Reserve
Aristides Sánchez
Arlen Siu
Armando Morales Barillas
Armando Morales
Arnoldo Alemán
Arroz a la valenciana
Arturo Cruz, Jr.
Arturo Cruz
Asociación de Scouts de Nicaragua
Atlantic Airlines (Nicaragua)
Atlas of Nicaragua
Atv98
Aubry Campbell Ingram
Augusto César Sandino
Authentic Costeño Autonomy Movement
Ave Maria University-Latin American Campus
Avena (drink)
Awas Tingni
Ayax Delgado
Azarías Pallais

B
Banana Wars
Banking in Nicaragua
Barbara Carrera
Barricada (FSLN)
Bartolomé Martínez
Battle for Río San Juan de Nicaragua
Belén, Rivas
Ben Linder
Benjamín Lacayo Sacasa
Big stick diplomacy
Bilwi
Blanca Castellón
Bluefields Airport
Bluefields
Boaco (department)
Boaco
Bocana de Paiwas
Bolsa de Valores de Nicaragua
Bonanza Airport
Bonanza, North Caribbean Coast Autonomous Region
Bosawás Biosphere Reserve
Bronzy hermit
Bryan–Chamorro Treaty
Buddhism in Nicaragua
Buenos Aires, Rivas
Buff-collared nightjar

C
Cabo Gracias a Dios
Camoapa
Canal 4
Canal 6
Canal 9
Canal 10
Canal 15
Capital of Nicaragua:  Managua
Captaincy General of Guatemala
Carazo (department)
Cárdenas, Rivas
Caribbean Lowlands
Carlos Alberto Brenes Jarquín
Carlos Fonseca
Carlos José Solórzano
Carlos Mejía Godoy
Carne Pinchada
Carolina wren
Catarina, Masaya
Categories:
:Category:Nicaragua
:Category:Airlines of Nicaragua
:Category:Airports in Nicaragua
:Category: Nicaraguan people
:Category: Nicaraguan politicians
:Category:Aviation in Nicaragua
:Category:Bananas
:Category:Baseball in Nicaragua
:Category:Baseball venues in Nicaragua
:Category:Beaches of Nicaragua
:Category:Biota of Nicaragua
:Category:Birds of Nicaragua
:Category:Buildings and structures in Nicaragua
:Category:Cinema of Nicaragua
:Category:Cities in Nicaragua
:Category:Communications in Nicaragua
:Category:Companies of Nicaragua
:Category:Contras
:Category:Crime in Nicaragua
:Category:Defunct airlines of Nicaragua
:Category:Departments of Nicaragua
:Category:Economy of Nicaragua
:Category:Education in Nicaragua
:Category:Elections in Nicaragua
:Category:Environment of Nicaragua
:Category:Fauna of Nicaragua
:Category:Flora of Nicaragua
:Category:Football in Nicaragua
:Category:Football venues in Nicaragua
:Category:Foreign relations of Nicaragua
:Category:Geography of Nicaragua
:Category:Government of Nicaragua
:Category:Health in Nicaragua
:Category:Health in Nicaragua
:Category:History of Nicaragua
:Category:Hurricanes in Nicaragua
:Category:Islands of Nicaragua
:Category:Lakes of Nicaragua
:Category:Languages of Nicaragua
:Category:Law enforcement in Nicaragua
:Category:Law of Nicaragua
:Category:Mass media in Nicaragua
:Category:Military of Nicaragua
:Category:Miss Nicaragua winners
:Category:Mountains of Nicaragua
:Category:Municipalities of the Boaco Department
:Category:Municipalities of the Carazo Department
:Category:Municipalities of the Chinandega Department
:Category:Municipalities of the Chontales Department
:Category:Municipalities of the Estelí Department
:Category:Municipalities of the Granada Department
:Category:Municipalities of the Jinotega Department
:Category:Municipalities of the León Department
:Category:Municipalities of the Madriz Department
:Category:Municipalities of the Managua Department
:Category:Municipalities of the Masaya Department
:Category:Municipalities of the Matagalpa Department
:Category:Municipalities of the Nueva Segovia Department
:Category:Municipalities of the North Caribbean Coast Autonomous Region
:Category:Municipalities of the South Caribbean Coast Autonomous Region
:Category:Municipalities of the Río San Juan Department
:Category:Municipalities of the Rivas Department
:Category:Municipalities of Nicaragua
:Category:Museums in Nicaragua
:Category:Natural history of Nicaragua
:Category:Nature conservation in Nicaragua
:Category:Newspapers published in Nicaragua
:Category:Nicaragua at the Olympics
:Category:Nicaragua geography stubs
:Category:Nicaragua stubs
:Category:Nicaraguan actors
:Category:Nicaraguan Americans
:Category:Nicaraguan anti-communists
:Category:Nicaraguan baseball players
:Category:Nicaraguan boxers
:Category:Nicaraguan cheeses
:Category:Nicaraguan cuisine
:Category:Nicaraguan culture
:Category:Nicaraguan diplomats
:Category:Nicaraguan families
:Category:Nicaraguan film actors
:Category:Football clubs in Nicaragua
:Category:Football competitions in Nicaragua
:Category:Nicaraguan footballers
:Category:Nicaraguan military personnel
:Category:Nicaraguan models
:Category:Nicaraguan murder victims
:Category:Nicaraguan music
:Category:Nicaraguan people by occupation
:Category:Nicaraguan people stubs
:Category:Nicaraguan people
:Category:Nicaraguan poets
:Category:Nicaraguan politicians
:Category:Nicaraguan rebels
:Category:Nicaraguan rebels
:Category:Nicaraguan revolutionaries
:Category:Nicaraguan Roman Catholic priests
:Category:Nicaraguan sportspeople
:Category:Nicaraguan television actors
:Category:Nicaraguan writers
:Category:Nicaragua-related lists
:Category:People of the Banana Wars
:Category:Political parties in Nicaragua
:Category:Politics of Nicaragua
:Category:Presidents of Nicaragua
:Category:Religion in Nicaragua
:Category:Rivers of Nicaragua
:Category:Sandinista National Liberation Front
:Category:Schools in Nicaragua
:Category:Society of Nicaragua
:Category:Sport in Nicaragua
:Category:Sports venues in Nicaragua
:Category:Television stations in Nicaragua
:Category:Military units and formations of the United States in the Banana Wars
:Category:Banana Wars ships of the United States
:Category:Trade unions in Nicaragua
:Category:Transportation in Nicaragua
:Category:Trees of Nicaragua
:Category:Universities in Nicaragua
:Category:Volcanoes of Nicaragua
commons:Category:Nicaragua
CDNN 23
Cecilia & The Argonauts
CECIM
Central America
Central America Hurricane of 1941
Central American Defense Council
Central American Parliament
Central American Unionist Party
Cerro Arenal Natural Reserve
Cerro Negro
Chacraseca
Chamorro (family)
Chesty Puller
Chichigalpa
Chinandega (department)
Chinandega, Chinandega
Chinandega
Chinese Nicaraguan
Chocoyero Nature Reserve
Chontales
Christian F. Schilt
Christian Unity Movement
Christianne Meneses Jacobs
Chureca
Churrasco
Cinco Pinos
Ciudad Antigua
Ciudad Darío
Ciudad Sandino
Civic Association of Potosí
Claribel Alegría

Clark Memorandum
Clodomiro Picado Twight
Coast Alliance
Coast People's Party
Coat of arms of Nicaragua
Coco River
Colegio Centro América
Colombia-Nicaragua relations
Comalapa, Chontales
Comedor Escolar Project
Communications in Nicaragua
Communist Party of Nicaragua
Concepción (volcano)
Condega
Confederation of Labour Unification
Conservative Alliance
Conservative Party of Nicaragua
Constitutionalist Liberal Party
Contras
Cordillera Los Maribios
Corinto, Nicaragua
Corn Island Airport
Corn Islands
Cosiguina
Costeño Democratic Alliance
Cuisine of Nicaragua
Culture of Nicaragua
Cupressus lusitanica

D
Daisy Zamora
Dance in Nicaragua
Daniel Ortega
David Green (baseball player)
Democratic Conservative Party
Democratic Party (Nicaragua)
Democratic Party of National Confidence
Democratic Revolutionary Alliance
Demographics of Nicaragua
Dennis Martínez
Dennis Martínez National Stadium
Departments of Nicaragua
Deportivo Bluefields
Deportivo Jalapa (Nicaragua)
Deportivo Masatepe
Deportivo Walter Ferretti
Desembocadura de la Cruz de Río Grande
Devern Hansack
Diego Manuel Chamorro Bolaños
Dimension Costena
Dipilto
Diria
Diriamba
Diriangén FC
Diriangén
Diriomo
DJ Craze
Dollar Diplomacy
Dolores, Carazo
Donald Vega

E
Ecocanal
Ecologist Green Party of Nicaragua
Economic history of Nicaragua
Economy of Nicaragua
Edén Pastora
Edgar Chamorro
Edmundo Jarquín
Eduardo Montealegre
Education in Nicaragua
El Almendro
El Arenal Natural Reserve
El Ayote
El Castillo (municipality)
El Castillo (village)
El Coral
El Crucero
El Cuá
El Güegüense
El Jicaral
El Jícaro, Nueva Segovia
El Nuevo Diario
El Rama
El Realejo
El Rosario, Carazo
El Sauce, León
El Tortugero
El Viejo
Elections in Nicaragua
Emiliano Chamorro Vargas
Emiliano Madriz
Emilio Alvarez Lejarza
Emilio Alvarez Montalván
Enlace Nicaragua (Canal 21)
Enrique Bermúdez
Enrique Bolaños
Enrique Gottel
Eric Volz
Ernesto Cardenal
Ernesto Leal
Erwin Krüger
Esquipulas, Matagalpa
Estadio Cacique Diriangén
Estadio Independencia
Estadio Olímpico de San Marcos
Estelí (department)
Estelí
Estero Padre Ramos Natural Reserve
ESTV (Canal 11)
Evaristo Carazo
Evaristo Rocha

F
FC San Marcos
Federación Nacional de Muchachas Guías de Nicaragua

Federación Nicaragüense de Fútbol
Federal Republic of Central America
Feminist ideology during the Sandinista Revolution
Fernando "El Negro" Chamorro
Fernando Agüero
Fernando Chamorro Alfaro
Fernando Guzmán
Flag of Nicaragua
Foreign relations of Nicaragua
Fortress of the Immaculate Conception
Francisco Urcuyo Maliaños
Fruto Chamorro

G
Gabriel Traversari
Gallo pinto
Garifuna language
Gaspar García Laviana
Geography of Nicaragua
Gil González Dávila
Gioconda Belli
Good Neighbor policy
Granada (department)
Granada, Granada, Nicaragua
Granada, Nicaragua
Gray-rumped swift
Great Liberal Union
Greater pewee
Greytown, Nicaragua
Grupo Armado
Güirila
Guillermo Sevilla Sacasa
Gulf of Fonseca (Golfo de Fonseca)

H
Hammond's flycatcher
Hay–Bunau-Varilla Treaty
Hay–Herrán Treaty
Herty Lewites
History of Nicaragua
Hoffmann's two-toed sloth
Hugo Palma-Ibarra
Humberto Ortega
Hunguhungu
Hurricane Beta
Hurricane Cesar–Douglas
Hurricane Felix
Hurricane Gert
Hurricane Greta–Olivia
Hurricane Irene–Olivia
Hurricane Joan–Miriam
Hurricane Mitch

I
Ignacio Chávez (President of Nicaragua)
Independent Liberal Party (Nicaragua)
Independent Liberal Party for National Unity
Indio Maíz Biological Reserve
INCAE Business School 
International Organization for Standardization (ISO)
ISO 3166-1 alpha-2 country code for the Nicaragua: NI
ISO 3166-1 alpha-3 country code for the Nicaragua: NIC
ISO 3166-2:NI region codes for the Nicaragua
Iran–Contra affair
Isla de Cozumel
Islam in Nicaragua
Islands of Nicaragua

J
J Smooth
Jaguar
Jaguarundi
Jalapa, Nueva Segovia
Jewish Nicaraguan
Jinotega (department)
Jinotega, Jinotega
Jinotega
Jinotepe, Carazo
Jinotepe
Joaquín Cuadra
Joaquín Zavala
John Negroponte
Jorge Salazar
José Areas
José Coronel Urtecho
José Dolores Estrada (president)
José Dolores Estrada
José Francisco Cardenal
José León Sandoval
José Madriz
José María Estrada
José María Moncada Tapia
José Rizo Castellón
José Santos Zelaya
José Vicente Cuadra
Joseph A. Harrison
Joseph Adams
Joseph Henry Pendleton
Juan Bautista Sacasa
Juan José Estrada
Juigalpa, Chontales
Juigalpa
Julio Valle Castillo
Junta of National Reconstruction
Justo Abaunza

K
Kukra Hill
Katia Cardenal

L
La Chureca
La Concepción, Masaya
La Concordia, Jinotega
La Conquista
La Costeña
La Cruz de Río Grande
La Libertad, Chontales
La Paz Centro
La Paz de Carazo
La Prensa (Managua)
La Trinidad, Estelí
Laguna de Perlas
Lake Apanás
Lake Managua
Lake Nicaragua
Languages of Nicaragua
Larreynaga
Las Lajas (volcano)
Las Peñitas, Nicaragua
Las Pilas
Las Sabanas
Latin America
Laureano Pineda
Legitimist Party (Nicaragua)
Legitimists (Nicaragua)
León (department)
León, Nicaragua
Leonardo Argüello Barreto
LGBT rights in Nicaragua (Gay rights)
Liberal-Conservative Junta
Liberalism in Nicaragua
Lincoln International Academy
Linux Tour
Lists related to Nicaragua:
Diplomatic missions of Nicaragua
List of airports in Nicaragua
List of banks in Nicaragua
List of birds of Nicaragua
List of books and films about Nicaragua
List of cinemas in Nicaragua
List of cities in Nicaragua
List of diplomatic missions in Nicaragua
List of Films and Books about Nicaragua
List of hospitals in Nicaragua
List of islands of Nicaragua
List of mammals in Nicaragua
List of museums in Nicaragua
List of Nicaraguan Americans
List of Nicaraguan writers
List of Nicaraguans
List of Nicaragua-related topics
List of players from Nicaragua in Major League Baseball
List of political parties in Nicaragua
List of radio stations in Nicaragua
List of rivers of Nicaragua
List of schools in Nicaragua
List of shopping malls in Nicaragua
List of volcanoes in Nicaragua
Outline of Nicaragua
Universities in Nicaragua
Literature of Nicaragua
Lorenzo Guerrero Gutiérrez
Los Doce
Luis Alberto Pérez
Luis Mena
Luis Somoza Debayle
Luisa Amanda Espinoza Association of Nicaraguan Women
Lya Barrioz

M
Macuá
Macuelizo, Nueva Segovia
Maderas
Madriz Department
Magic Channel
Managua
Managua Department
Managua International Airport
Manuel Fernando Zurita
Manuel Pérez
Mar Caribe
Marvin Benard
Marxist–Leninist Popular Action Movement
Masatepe
Masaya Department
Masaya Volcano
Masaya
Mass media in Nicaragua
Matagalpa Department
Matagalpa language
Matagalpa
Mateare
Matiguás
Mayan cichlid
Mercedes Tenorio
Merritt A. Edson
Metropolitan Cathedral of the Immaculate Conception
Michael Cordúa
Miguel d'Escoto Brockmann
Miguel Larreynaga
Miguel Obando y Bravo
Military of Nicaragua
Miskito
Miskito Cays
Miskito language
Mogotón
Mombacho
Momotombo
Monroe Doctrine
Montelimar Beach
Montezuma oropendola
Morrito
Mosquito Coast
Moyogalpa
Mozonte
Muelle de los Bueyes, South Caribbean Coast Autonomous Region
Multiethnic Indigenist Party
Multiethnic Party for Coast Unity
Mulukuku, North Caribbean Coast Autonomous Region
Murra, Nueva Segovia
Museum of Traditions and Legends
Music of Nicaragua
Muy Muy

N
Nacatamal
Nagarote
Nandaime
Nandasmo
National Action Party (Nicaragua)
National anthem of Nicaragua
National Assembly of Nicaragua
National Autonomous University of Nicaragua
National Conservative Action
National Guard (Nicaragua)
National Opposition Union
National Opposition Union
National Project
National symbols of Nicaragua
National System of Protected Areas (Nicaragua)
National Unity Movement
New Liberal Party
Nica (toponym)
Nicaragua
Nicaragua at the 1968 Summer Olympics
Nicaragua at the 1972 Summer Olympics
Nicaragua at the 1976 Summer Olympics
Nicaragua at the 1980 Summer Olympics
Nicaragua at the 1984 Summer Olympics
Nicaragua at the 1992 Summer Olympics
Nicaragua at the 1996 Summer Olympics
Nicaragua at the 2000 Summer Olympics
Nicaragua at the 2004 Summer Olympics
Nicaragua Betrayed
Nicaragua Canal
Nicaragua Christian Academy
Nicaragua national football team
Nicaragua under Mexican rule
Nicaragua v. United States
Nicaraguan American
Nicaraguan Campaign Medal
Nicaraguan Christian Democratic Union
Nicaraguan córdoba
Nicaraguan Democratic Force
Nicaraguan Democratic Movement
Nicaraguan diplomatic missions
Nicaraguan fifty-cordoba note
Nicaraguan five hundred-cordoba note
Nicaraguan general election, 2006
Nicaraguan Institute of Natural Resources and the Environment
Nicaraguan Liberal Alliance
Nicaraguan Literacy Campaign
Nicaraguan one hundred-cordoba note
Nicaraguan Party of the Christian Path
Nicaraguan peso
Nicaraguan Resistance Party
Nicaraguan Sign Language
Nicaraguan Social Christian Party
Nicaraguan Socialist Party
Nicaraguan ten-cordoba note
Nicaraguan twenty-cordoba note
Nicaraguan Workers' Centre
Nicaraguan
Nicaragüense de Aviación (NICA)
Nicarao (cacique)
Nicarao people
Nicavisión (Canal 12)
Nicolás Osorno
Nindirí, Masaya
Nindirí
Niquinomo
Nora Astorga
North America
Nueva Guinea
Nueva Segovia
Nutting's flycatcher

O
Occupation of Nicaragua
Ocelot
Ocotal
Olive warbler
Omar Cabezas
Omar D'León 
Ometepe
Operation Gold
Organization of Central American States
Orlando Montenegro Medrano
Oscar Danilo Blandón
Oswaldo Castillo
Outline of Nicaragua

P
Palacagüina
Palestinian Nicaraguan
Palm tanager
Palo de Mayo
Pantasma
Partido de Nicoya
Party for Citizen Action
Patricio Rivas
Pearl Cays
Pearl kite
Pedro Joaquín Chamorro Alfaro
Pedro Joaquín Chamorro Cardenal
Pinolero
Pinolillo
Pio Quinto
Plain chachalaca
Plain-brown woodcreeper
Plus Ultra Brigade
Political history of Nicaragua
Politics of Nicaragua
Polytechnic University of Nicaragua
Poneloya, Nicaragua
Popular Conservative Alliance
Popular Social Christian Party
Porfi Altamirano
Posoltega, Nicaragua
Potosí, Rivas
President of Nicaragua
Primera División de Nicaragua
Prinzapolka
Protected areas of Nicaragua
Psychological Operations in Guerrilla Warfare
Pueblo Nuevo, Estelí
Puerto Cabezas Airport
Puerto Cabezas
Puerto Morazán
Puerto Sandino

Q
Quesillo
Quezalguate
Quilalí

R
Rail transport in Nicaragua
Rafaela Herrera
Rama language
Rama people
Rancho Grande
Rationing in Nicaragua
Real Estelí
Real Madriz
North Caribbean Coast Autonomous Region
South Caribbean Coast Autonomous Region
Religion in Nicaragua
René Schick Gutiérrez
Republic of Nicaragua (República de Nicaragua)
Revolutionary Unity Movement
Revolutionary Workers' Party (Nicaragua)
Ricardo Mayorga
Rigoberto Cruz
Rigoberto López Pérez
Río Blanco, Matagalpa
Río San Juan (department)
Rivas (department)
Rivas
Roberto Sacasa
Róger Calero
Róger Pérez de la Rocha
Role of women in Nicaraguan Revolution
Roman Catholicism in Nicaragua
Roman Gonzalez
Roosevelt Corollary
Rosario Murillo
Rosendo Alvarez
Rosendo Chamorro
Rosita Airport
Rota (volcano)
Roy Geiger
Rubén Darío
Rufous motmot

S
Salomón Ibarra Mayorga
Salvador Machado
"Salve a ti, Nicaragua"
San Carlos, Río San Juan
San Cristóbal volcano
San Dionisio, Matagalpa
San Fernando, Nueva Segovia
San Francisco de Cuapa
San Francisco del Norte
San Francisco Libre
San Isidro, Matagalpa
San Jorge, Rivas
San José de Achuapa
San José de Bocay
San José de Cusmapa
San José de los Remates
San Juan de Limay
San Juan de Nicaragua
San Juan de Oriente
San Juan del Río Coco
San Juan del Sur, Rivas
San Juan del Sur
San Juan River (Nicaragua)
San Lorenzo, Boaco
San Lucas, Madriz
San Marcos, Carazo
San Marcos, Nicaragua
San Miguelito, Río San Juan
San Nicolás, Estelí
San Pedro Airport, Nicaragua
San Pedro de Lóvago
San Pedro del Norte
San Rafael del Norte, Jinotega
San Rafael del Norte
San Rafael del Sur
San Ramón, Matagalpa
San Sebastián de Yalí
Sandinismo
Sandinista Ideologies
Sandinista National Liberation Front
Sandinista Popular Army
Sandinista Renovation Movement
Sandinista Workers' Centre
Santa Lucía, Boaco
Santa María de Pantasma
Santa María, Nueva Segovia
Santa Rosa del Peñón
Santa Teresa, Carazo
Santo Domingo, Chontales
Santo Tomás del Norte
Santo Tomás, Chontales
Scorpión FC
Sébaco
Sebastián Uriza
Semilla de Jicaro
Sergio Ramírez
Shawn Hasani Martin
Silvestre Selva
Sistema Nacional de Televisión (Nicaragua)
Sistema Sandinista de Televisión
Siuna Airport
Siuna
Smedley Butler
Snowcap
Social Conservative Party
Social Democratic Party (Nicaragua)
Solentiname Islands
Somotillo
Somoto Canyon National Monument
Somoto, Madriz
Somoto
Somoza
Sopa de Mondongo
Southern rough-winged swallow
Spanish colonization of the Americas
Spanish conquest of Nicaragua
Spanish language
Sumo language
Supreme Electoral Council

T
T-Bone
Teatro Nacional Rubén Darío
Telenica (Canal 8)
Telenorte Canal 35
Televicentro (Canal 2)
Telica
Telica (volcano)
Telpaneca
Terrabona
Territorial disputes of Nicaragua
Teustepe
The Catholic Church and the Nicaraguan Revolution
The Freedom Fighter's Manual
Thelma Rodríguez
Ticuantepe
Timeline of Colombia-Nicaragua relations
Tipitapa
Tip-Top Restaurant
Tiscapa Lagoon Natural Reserve
Tisma
Tola, Rivas
Tomás Borge
Tomás Martínez
Tony Melendez
Torombolo
Totogalpa
Tourism in Nicaragua
Transportation in Nicaragua
Tropical Storm Bret (1993)
Tuma-La Dalia
Turquoise-browed motmot

U
United Fruit Company
United Nations founding member state 1945
United Nicaraguan Opposition
United States embargo against Nicaragua
United States embargo against Nicaragua
Unity Alliance
Universidad Centroamericana
Universidad Nacional Agraria
Universidad Nacional de Ingeniería
Universities in Nicaragua
UNO-96 Alliance
Up with the Republic
Uriel Molina

V
Vaho
Vicente Padilla
Víctor Manuel Román y Reyes
Vigorón
Villa El Carmen
Villanueva, Chinandega
Villa Sandino
Violeta Chamorro
Viva Managua Movement
VMA-231
Volcanoes of Nicaragua
Voseo

W
Waslala
Waspam
Waspam Airport
Water supply and sanitation in Nicaragua
Whiskered screech owl
White-shouldered tanager

Wildlife of Nicaragua
William Walker (soldier)
Witness for Peace
Wiwilí de Jinotega
Wiwilí de Nueva Segovia
Women and the Armed Struggle in Nicaragua

X
Xavier Chamorro Cardenal

Y
Yalagüina
YATAMA

Z
Zapatera
Zelaya (Nicaragua)

See also

List of Central America-related topics
List of international rankings
Lists of country-related topics
Outline of geography
Outline of Nicaragua
Outline of North America
United Nations

References

External links

 
Nicaragua